Harold Everett (9 June 1922 – 2000) was an English professional footballer who played in the Football League for Mansfield Town.

References

1922 births
2000 deaths
English footballers
Association football defenders
English Football League players
Mansfield Town F.C. players
Notts County F.C. players